Christopher Scott Booker (born December 9, 1976) is a former Major League Baseball pitcher. He is currently the pitching coach for the Billings Mustangs.

Booker was drafted in the 20th round of the  amateur draft by the Chicago Cubs. He'd remain in the Cubs organization until the 2001 season where he was acquired by the Cincinnati Reds. Booker remained four years at the minor league level before making his major league debut in 2005.  The Washington Nationals signed him as a free agent in November . The Detroit Tigers drafted him in the December 2005 Rule 5 draft and he was immediately purchased from the Tigers by the Philadelphia Phillies. The Kansas City Royals selected him off of waivers on May 12, 2006. In his only appearance with Kansas City on May 13, 2006, Booker gave up three home runs in an inning. Booker was then placed on the disabled list with a groin injury. He was returned to the Nationals by the Royals on July 14, 2006. Booker made a career high 10 appearances out of the Washington bullpen in 2006. He retired after the 2008 season.

References

External links

1976 births
Cincinnati Reds players
Columbus Clippers players
Gulf Coast Cubs players
Kansas City Royals players
African-American baseball players
Living people
Louisville Bats players
Major League Baseball pitchers
Baseball players from Alabama
People from Monroeville, Alabama
New Orleans Zephyrs players
Omaha Royals players
Washington Nationals players
21st-century African-American sportspeople
20th-century African-American sportspeople
Chattanooga Lookouts players
Clearwater Threshers players
Dayton Dragons players
Daytona Cubs players
Rockford Cubbies players
Scranton/Wilkes-Barre Red Barons players
West Tennessee Diamond Jaxx players
Wichita Wranglers players
Williamsport Cubs players